Thomas Sardorf (born April 3, 1979) is a popular Danish singer who is part of the popular Danish/Punjabi singing band Bombay Rockers along with co-singer Navtej Singh Rehal.

Sardorf was born in Copenhagen, Denmark and ever since he was young, had aspired to become a singer. He met his future co-singer Navtej Singh Rehal in Copenhagen in 2002, and along with Rehal, both of them formed the band, which went on to become one of India's and Denmark's most popular singing bands called as Bombay Rockers.

Rehal delivers the Punjabi vocals, whereas Sardorf delivers the English vocals; together he and Rehal have sung numerous songs well known in Denmark and India, especially their very famous song "Kushi", which stood at the No. 1 position in the Indian Album charts in 2007. Sardorf and Rehal's debut album in the Bombay Rockers Introducing has been certified as Platinum in Canada, Denmark and India, for selling more than 100,000 albums.

His band Bombay Rockers has been currently signed to the music company  Times Music, disco:wax.

Besides singing, he has appeared in various television shows in Denmark, for promoting his songs from his band Bombay Rockers, he has appeared in television shows like GO' Aften Danmark and Snurre Snups Sondagsklub. A song of his Ari Ari Part II appeared in the 2007 film Outsourced.

Discography

Studio albums
Introducing... (2005)
Crash And Burn (2007)
All or Nothing feat. Bombay Rockers (Overseas album) (2008)
Rock And Dhol (2011)

Singles
"Sexy Mama" (2003)
"Wild Rose" (2005)t
"Out of Control" (2006)
"Kushi" (2007)
"Beautiful" (2007)
"Nach Lay feat. Bombay Rockers" (2008)
"Let's Dance"(2011)

Remix albums
Rock Tha Party & Sexy Mama (2004)

References

1979 births
Living people
21st-century Danish male singers